Xenelaphis is a genus of snakes of the family Colubridae, which are found in Southeast Asia. There are two species in this genus, the ornate brown snake, Xenelaphis ellipsifer and the more widespread Malayan brown snake, Xenelaphis hexagonotus.

Species
 Xenelaphis ellipsifer Boulenger, 1900
 Xenelaphis hexagonotus (Cantor, 1847)

References

Xenelaphis
Snake genera
Taxa named by Albert Günther